HMS Keppel can refer to ships of the Royal Navy named after Admiral Augustus Keppel

 - was the American 14-gun privateer brig New Broom that the Royal Navy captured in 1778. Sold in 1783.
 - a Thornycroft type destroyer leader, launched 1920, broken up 1945.

Royal Navy ship names